James Harry Johnson  (born 24 May 1929) is a retired major general in the United States Army. His assignments included Assistant Deputy Chief of Staff for Operations and Plans at the US Army Headquarters. Johnson is an alumnus of the University of Maryland, where he earned a B.S. degree in physical education in 1950. He graduated from the Army Command and General Staff College in 1960.

Johnson was awarded the Distinguished Service Cross, Silver Star Medal, Bronze Star Medal and six Air Medals for his actions in combat. He served with the 4th Battalion, 503rd Infantry Regiment, 173rd Airborne Brigade in Vietnam as a lieutenant colonel.

References

1929 births
Living people
People from Washington, D.C.
University System of Maryland alumni
United States Army personnel of the Vietnam War
Recipients of the Air Medal
Recipients of the Silver Star
Recipients of the Distinguished Service Cross (United States)
Recipients of the Legion of Merit
United States Army generals
Recipients of the Defense Superior Service Medal